PGH may refer to:

Organisations
 Philadelphia General Hospital, in Philadelphia, Pennsylvania, US
 Philippine General Hospital, in Manila, the Philippines
 Piedmont Geriatric Hospital, in Burkeville, Virginia, US
 Pengrowth Energy Trust (New York Stock Exchange ticker symbol), a former Canadian energy company

Places
 Pittsburgh, Pennsylvania, US
 Union Station (Pittsburgh), (station code)

Science
 Placental growth hormone, a form of growth hormone
 Preimplantation Genetic Haplotyping, a clinical method in medicine